Fakker is the third solo album by the Austrian hip-hop musician Nazar. It was released on 13 May 2011 by Wolf Pack Entertainment and distributed by Soulfood Music In the summer of 2010 a new track of Nazar's, entitled My Town was released on YouTube. In the following months, Nazar began work with RAF Camora and The Royals on his new solo album. Prior to the album release came the opening of the Austrian documentary Schwarzkopf in cinemas.

The album reached 6th in the Ö3 Austria Top 40, and 36th in the German Media Control Charts.

Track listing

Production 
The majority of the album production was by Raf Camora, The Royals and Nazar. Nazar and Camora produced the titles Meine Fans, F.O.T.U,  Keinen Bock, Fakkerlifestyle, Gib mir nicht die Schuld , Comic-Helden aus dem Solarium and Gib mir die Welt together with The Royals. They received support during the Intro and Outro by Nazar, in Krankes Ego by Benno and Exibitionist by X-plosives. Another Beat was contributed by Undercover Molotov. This is the title assigned to the Farben des Lebens. The beat of Amethyst comes from Gee Futuristic and Hookbeats. Tua took over the production of Sprinten und Fallen and Flammen über Wien Pt.  3rd. Lastly, STI was responsible for the background music of Volim Te. The guitar used in it was played by Raf Camora.

Chart performance

References

External links
 Illuminati Film Production

2011 albums
Nazar (rapper) albums
German-language albums